WADS (690 AM; "Radio Amor") is a radio station broadcasting a Spanish language Christian radio format, licensed to Ansonia, Connecticut, it serves the Bridgeport area. The station is currently owned by Radio Amor, Inc.

WADS has been silent since August 12, 2022, due to losing its transmission site.

References

External links

Ansonia, Connecticut
Mass media in New Haven County, Connecticut
Mass media in Fairfield County, Connecticut
Radio stations established in 1956
ADS
1956 establishments in Connecticut
ADS
ADS